Travor Mutsamba is a Zimbabwean cricketer. He made his List A debut for Mountaineers in the 2017–18 Pro50 Championship on 30 May 2018. He made his first-class debut on 3 March 2020, for Mountaineers in the 2019–20 Logan Cup. He made his Twenty20 debut on 11 April 2021, for Rocks, in the 2020–21 Zimbabwe Domestic Twenty20 Competition.

References

External links
 

Year of birth missing (living people)
Living people
Zimbabwean cricketers
Place of birth missing (living people)
Mountaineers cricketers
Southern Rocks cricketers